Brownout may refer to:

 Brownout (electricity), drop in voltage in an electrical power supply, so named because it typically causes lights to dim
 Brownout (software engineering), a technique inspired by brownout in electricity, to make applications more tolerant to capacity shortages
 Brownout (aeronautics), reduced flight visibility due to airborne particles, especially from helicopter downwash
 Brownout (album), studio album by American band Head Set
 Brownout (band), a band from Austin, Texas

See also 
 Greyout, a dimming of the vision caused by loss of blood pressure or hypoxia
 Redout, affected vision caused by increased blood flow to the head
 Blackout (disambiguation)
 Whiteout (disambiguation)
 Eddie Leonski (1917–1942), American soldier and serial killer, responsible for the strangling murders of three women in Melbourne, Australia, also known as "The Brownout Strangler"